Alena Evdokimova is a Russian wheelchair fencer, who won bronze in the women's épée B event at the 2020 Summer Paralympics.

She competed at the 2016 IWAS Under-17 and Under-23 Wheelchair Fencing World Championships, winning a gold medal.

References 

Living people
Russian female épée fencers
Wheelchair fencers at the 2020 Summer Paralympics
Medalists at the 2020 Summer Paralympics
Paralympic silver medalists for the Russian Paralympic Committee athletes
Paralympic medalists in wheelchair fencing
Paralympic wheelchair fencers of Russia
Year of birth missing (living people)
21st-century Russian women